Citronella mucronata, the huillipatagua or Chilean citronella tree, is an evergreen tree native to Chile, it occurs from 30 to 41°  South latitude. In Chile, the tree grows from 500 to 2000 meters above sea-level in low altitude interior valleys and coastal mountains.

Description
It reaches up to 10 m (30 ft) and 1 m (3 ft) in diameter. The bark is dark gray and rough. The leaves are alternate, leathery, the edge is entire or toothed, ovate or oblong with an acute apex (tip) which ends in a mucro (sharp point). The leaves are about 4,5-6 long and  2,5–4 cm and wide, with domatia in the axils of the side veins, and the veins are yellow, the leaves are glossy green above, and paler below. Small petioles. The flowers are hermaphrodite and whitish yellow and arranged in terminal panicles 4–8 cm long. The calyx is made up by 5 sepals, the corolla has 5 free petals. The fruit is a spherical drupe about 1–1.2 cm in diameter which is purple when mature.

Cultivation and uses
The tree has been planted in Spain.

References and external links

Donoso, C. 2005. Árboles nativos de Chile. Guía de reconocimiento. Edición 4. Marisa Cuneo Ediciones, Valdivia, Chile. 136p.
Hechenleitner P., Gardner M, Thomas P., Echeverría C., Escobar B., Brownless P. & Martínez C. 2005. Plantas Amenazadas del Centro-Sur de Chile. Distribución, Conservación y Propagación. Primera Edición. Universidad Austral de Chile y Real Jardín Botánico de Edimburgo, Valdivia. 188p.
Hoffmann, Adriana. 1998. Flora Silvestre de Chile, Zona Central. Edición 4. Fundación Claudio Gay, Santiago. 254p.
Citronella mucronata in Encyclopedia of Chilean Flora
Images and description from Chilebosque website

Trees of Chile
Cardiopteridaceae
Trees of Mediterranean climate
Ornamental trees
Least concern plants